Ursuline Campus Schools is a small system of schools located on one,  campus on Lexington Road in Louisville, KY. It consists of five schools:

Sacred Heart Academy: Girls' High School
Sacred Heart Model School: co-ed school, Grades K-8
Ursuline Montessori School: Preschool that uses the Montessori method of education
Ursuline Child Development Center: Preschool that uses traditional education methods
Ursuline School for the Performing Arts: Performing Arts School for all ages - includes visual art, drama, music, and dance disciplines at all levels

References

See also 
 Ursuline Nuns of the Immaculate Conception

Education in Kentucky